Yevgeni Yevgenyevich Shelyutov (born 29 August 1981) is a former Russian professional football player.

Club career
He played 6 seasons in the Russian Football National League for FC Dynamo Bryansk and FC Salyut-Energia Belgorod.

Personal life
His younger brother Oleg Shelyutov is also a footballer.

References

External links
 

1981 births
People from Bryansk Oblast
Living people
Russian footballers
Association football forwards
FC Dynamo Bryansk players
FC Salyut Belgorod players
FC Oryol players
Sportspeople from Bryansk Oblast